Lin Ying-chieh (born 1 May 1981) is a Taiwanese baseball player who competed in the 2004 Summer Olympics.

References

1981 births
Living people
Asian Games medalists in baseball
Asian Games silver medalists for Chinese Taipei
Baseball players at the 2004 Summer Olympics
Baseball players at the 2010 Asian Games
Macoto Cobras players
Medalists at the 2010 Asian Games
Nippon Professional Baseball pitchers
Olympic baseball players of Taiwan
People from Taitung County
Sinon Bulls players
Taiwanese expatriate baseball players in Japan
Tohoku Rakuten Golden Eagles players
2006 World Baseball Classic players